Parmenas was one of the Seven Deacons. He is believed to have preached the gospel in Asia Minor. Parmenas suffered martyrdom in 98, under the persecution of Trajan. He is one of the 4 out of 7 deacons jointly celebrated on July 28th.

Christian tradition identifies him as the Bishop of Soli. Some take this to be Soli, Cyprus, while others interpret it as Soli, Cilicia.

Notes

98 deaths
Saints from Roman Anatolia
Christian saints from the New Testament
1st-century Christian martyrs
Seventy disciples
Year of birth unknown
1st-century bishops in Roman Anatolia